{{DISPLAYTITLE:C24H25ClFN5O3}}
The molecular formula C24H25ClFN5O3 (molar mass: 485.94 g/mol, exact mass: 485.1630 u) may refer to:

 Afatinib
 Canertinib (CI-1033)

Molecular formulas